Paul Ramelet (27 November 1909 – 17 December 2002) was a Swiss sailor. He competed in the 5.5 Metre event at the 1964 Summer Olympics.

References

External links
 

1909 births
2002 deaths
Swiss male sailors (sport)
Olympic sailors of Switzerland
Sailors at the 1964 Summer Olympics – 5.5 Metre
Place of birth missing